Paul Matthew Niall Feehan (born 1961 in Dublin) studied electrical engineering at University College Dublin (BE 1982) and the University of Missouri at Rolla (ME 1984), before switching to mathematics.  His 1992 Phd on "Geometry of the Moduli Space of Self-Dual Connections on the Four-Sphere" was done at Columbia University under Duong Hong Phong.

He worked for several years at UC Berkeley, Harvard and Ohio State University, and in 2000 was appointed Erasmus Smith's Professor of Mathematics at TCD.  However, a year later he accepted a position at Rutgers, where he now does research in non-linear elliptic and parabolic partial differential equations, differential geometry, mathematical physics, and the applications of partial-integro differential equations to derivative security pricing and risk management. He is also Director of the Mathematical Finance Master's Degree Program at Rutgers. In 2019 he became a Fellow of the American Mathematical Society.

References

External links

Irish mathematicians
Alumni of University College Dublin
Missouri University of Science and Technology alumni
Columbia University alumni
University of California, Berkeley faculty
Harvard University faculty
Ohio State University faculty
Academics of Trinity College Dublin
Rutgers University faculty
Fellows of the American Mathematical Society
Living people
1961 births